Animal Farm is a 1954 animated film directed by animators John Halas and Joy Batchelor. It was produced by Halas and Batchelor and funded in part by the Central Intelligence Agency (CIA), who also made changes to the original movie script. It was based on the 1945 novel of the same name by George Orwell.  Although the film was a financial failure and took 15 years to generate a profit, it quickly became a staple in classrooms across the United Kingdom, the United States and other English-speaking countries like Australia, Canada, and New Zealand into the 1980s.

The film rights for a film adaptation of Animal Farm were bought from Orwell's widow after she was approached by agents working for the Office of Policy Coordination (OPC), a branch of the CIA that dealt with the use of culture to combat communism.

Maurice Denham provided the voice for all the animals in the film.

Plot 

Manor Farm is mismanaged by its drunken owner, Mr. Jones. Prize pig Old Major encourages the farm animals to oust Jones, and teaches them the revolutionary song "Beasts of England" before suddenly dying. Having not been fed, the animals break into the storehouse and help themselves. They drive Jones away, rename the farm "Animal Farm", and destroy the tools of oppression that had been used against them. They decide against living in the farmhouse, though Saddleback boar Napoleon is interested and begins to secretly raise an abandoned litter of puppies.

The Commandments of Animalism are written on a barn wall, the most important being: "All animals are equal". The farm runs smoothly and food becomes plentiful. The pigs become the leaders and claim special food items "by virtue of their brainwork". Old Major's successor Snowball wants a windmill, while Napoleon opposes it and has his dogs chase Snowball away, denouncing him as a traitor and declaring himself leader. He abolishes farm policy meetings, appropriates all decision-making, and advances the windmill plan that he had snubbed when his rival proposed it.

The pigs alter their laws. "No animal shall sleep in a bed" becomes "No animal shall sleep in a bed with sheets". Napoleon negotiates with Mr. Whymper to trade the hens' eggs for jellies and jams. The hens revolt by throwing their eggs at the pigs when the pigs attempt to seize the eggs by force. To impose his will through fear, Napoleon holds a show trial where a sheep and a duck are accused as traitors and butchered by the dogs. Their blood is used to append to the commandment "No animal shall kill another animal" the words "without cause". Napoleon bans "Beasts of England", declaring the revolution complete and the dream of Animal Farm realised.

A group of farmers attack Animal Farm and Jones blows up the windmill with himself inside. The animals win the battle at a great cost of lives. Boxer the workhorse, wounded, works to rebuild the windmill until he is gravely injured in an accident. Napoleon has a van take Boxer away, which Benjamin the donkey recognises as being from Whymper's glue factory. Napoleon's second-in-command Squealer delivers a sham eulogy, claiming Boxer's last words were to glorify Napoleon. The animals see through the propaganda but are driven away by the snarling dogs. The pigs toast Boxer's memory with whisky they bought with his life.

Years pass and Napoleon has expanded the neighbouring farms into an enterprise. The pigs walk upright, carry whips, drink alcohol and wear clothes. The Commandments are reduced to a single phrase: "All animals are equal, but some animals are more equal than others". Napoleon holds a dinner party for a delegation of outside pigs, who congratulate him on having the hardest-working and lowest-consuming animals in the country. They toast a future where pigs own farms everywhere. Benjamin imagines the pigs have taken on the likeness of Mr. Jones.

Acknowledging their situation is even worse than before the revolution, the animals storm the farmhouse. The guard dogs are too drunk to act (having been given full access to the distillery) while the animals smash through the house, trample Napoleon and the pigs to death, and reclaim the farm along with their freedom.

Production
After George Orwell's death in 1950, his widow Sonia Orwell sold the film rights to Animal Farm to film executives Carleton Alsop and Farris Farr. Unbeknownst to her, they were actually undercover agents for the Central Intelligence Agency's Office of Policy Coordination, which was funding anti-communist art for E. Howard Hunt's Psychological Warfare Workshop. Hunt chose The March of Time newsreel producer Louis de Rochemont and his production company as a front organization for the film's production. De Rochemont agreed so that he could release "frozen pounds" earned from ticket sales of his previous film Lost Boundaries, which were required to be spent on film productions staged in the United Kingdom. 

John Halas and Joy Batchelor were chosen as the film's directors because of their work on documentaries produced by the Marshall Plan and the British Ministry of Information. The CIA also distrusted American animators and illustrators due to the Red Scare and the Hollywood blacklist. Halas and Batchelor hired John F. Reed, the only American in the production, as animation director from The Walt Disney Studio. They also hired a team of 80 animators and technician from The Rank Organisation's disbanded animation division. Despite their background, Halas, Batchellor, and the film's animation crew were kept unaware that the film had been initiated and funded by the CIA.

Halas and Batchelor were awarded the contract to make the feature in November 1951 and it was completed in April 1954. Animation was done in London and camera work was done in Gloucestershire. During the film's production De Rochemont, acting on behalf of the CIA, had the film rewritten from the original novel's plot by Philip Strapp and Lothar Wolf to end with the other animals successfully revolting against the pigs. Batchelor strongly opposed the changed ending, although Halas later defended it. Fredric Warburg, the original publisher of the novel and a former MI6 agent, also served as a consultant on the film, suggesting that Old Major be given an appearance similar to Winston Churchill.

The CIA investors were allegedly initially greatly concerned that Snowball was presented too sympathetically in early script treatments and that Batchelor's script implied Snowball was "intelligent, dynamic, courageous". A memo declared that Snowball must be presented as a "fanatic intellectual whose plans if carried through would have led to disaster no less complete than under Napoleon." De Rochemont subsequently implemented these changes.

Release 
Much of the pre-release promotion for the film in the UK focused on it being a British film instead of a product of the Hollywood studios.

Scenes from Animal Farm, along with the 1954 TV program Nineteen Eighty-Four, were featured in "The Two Winstons", the final episode of Simon Schama's program A History of Britain broadcast June 18, 2002.

Four decades after the release of Animal Farm, Cold War historian Tony Shaw discovered, through looking at archives of the film, that the CIA had secretly purchased the rights to the film. The CIA also altered the ending of the film so that the pigs, who represent communists, were overthrown by the other animals on the farm.

When first released in 1954, the British Film Board felt the film was unsuitable for children and gave it a rating certificate of "X", prohibiting anyone younger than 21 from seeing the film. The rating has since been amended to "U" (Universal), stating the film as fit for audiences of all ages.

Animal Farm was the highest-grossing animation of 1954.

Reception and legacy
Film critic C. A. Lejeune wrote at the time: "I salute Animal Farm as a fine piece of work… [the production team] have made a film for the eye, ear, heart and mind". Matyas Seiber's score and Maurice Denham's vocal performance have been praised specifically (Denham provided every voice and animal noise in the film). The animation style has been described as "Disney-turned-serious". The movie holds  score at Rotten Tomatoes based on  critic reviews.

Some criticism was levelled at the altered ending, with one paper reporting, "Orwell would not have liked this one change, with its substitution of commonplace propaganda for his own reticent, melancholy satire".

The film took 15 years to recover its budget but earned profits in the next 5 years.

Comic strip adaptation
In 1954, Harold Whitaker, one of the film's animators, adapted the film into a comic strip published in various British regional newspapers.

In popular culture
The band The Clash used an image from the film on their 45-RPM single "English Civil War".

Home media
Animal Farm was released on Super 8 film in the 1970s, and received several home video releases in the UK and in America. American VHS releases were produced by Media Home Entertainment, Vestron Video, Avid Video, Wham! USA Entertainment, and Burbank Video. In the United States of 2001, it made a double feature DVD, Which now has THX on it, with  Fire and Ice (1983 film). Universal Pictures Home Entertainment released the film on DVD in the UK in 2003. In 2004, Home Vision Entertainment (HVE) released a 'Special Edition' DVD of the movie in the United States, including a documentary hosted by Tony Robinson.

In 2014, a 60th-anniversary Blu-ray was released by Network Distributing in the UK only.

See also

List of British films of 1954
Halas and Batchelor
List of American films of 1954
Office of Policy Coordination
Information Research Department

References

External links

 Animal Farm (1954)
 
Animal Farm at the TCM Movie Database
 
 
 Short British Pathe film on the making of the cartoon
 How the CIA brought Animal Farm to the screen
 Excerpt

1954 animated films
1954 films
1954 drama films
Animated drama films
Animated films about animals
Animated films based on novels
1950s American animated films
American satirical films
British adult animated films
British satirical films
Cold War films
Films based on Animal Farm
Films adapted into comics
1950s satirical films
Films directed by John Halas
1950s English-language films
Animated films about revenge
Films about pigs
American adult animated films
Halas and Batchelor films
Films set on farms
1950s British films